Sphenomorphus incognitus  is a species of skink found in China.

References

incognitus
Reptiles described in 1912
Taxa named by Joseph Cheesman Thompson
Reptiles of China